The 2012 CAF Confederation Cup qualifying rounds decided the eight teams which played in the group stage.

The schedule for the tournament was released in October 2011, and the draw for the first three rounds was held in Cairo on 9 December 2011.

Qualification ties were decided over two legs, with aggregate goals used to determine the winner. If the sides were level on aggregate after the second leg, the away goals rule was applied, and if still level, the tie proceeded directly to a penalty shootout (no extra time was played).

Preliminary round
This was a knock-out stage of the 32 teams that did not receive byes to the first round.

First legs: 17–19 February; Second legs: 2–4 March.

Étoile Filante won 2–1 on aggregate and advanced to the first round.

FC Séquence advanced to the first round after Nania withdrew.

FC Kallon won 2–1 on aggregate and advanced to the first round.

Black Leopards won 3–1 on aggregate and advanced to the first round.

Royal Leopards won 1–0 on aggregate and advanced to the first round.

Saint George SA won 5–0 on aggregate and advanced to the first round.

Simba won 3–2 on aggregate and advanced to the first round.

Note: Second leg postponed per request from Ferroviário de Maputo.

Ferroviário de Maputo won 4–0 on aggregate and advanced to the first round.

Unisport Bafang won 1–0 on aggregate and advanced to the first round.

AC Léopards won 4–2 on aggregate and advanced to the first round.

LLB Académic won 5–0 on aggregate and advanced to the first round.

Renaissance won 4–2 on aggregate and advanced to the first round.

Invincible Eleven advanced to the first round after ADR Desportivo de Mansabá withdrew.

1–1 on aggregate. Gamtel won the penalty shootout and advanced to the first round.

Tana Formation won 3–2 on aggregate and advanced to the first round.

Hwange won 7–1 on aggregate and advanced to the first round.

First round
This was a knock-out stage of 32 teams; the 16 teams advancing from the preliminary round, and 16 teams that received byes into this round.

First legs: 23–25 March; Second legs: 6–9 April.

ASEC Mimosas won 4–2 on aggregate and advanced to the second round.

CODM Meknès won 5–0 on aggregate and advanced to the second round.

Warri Wolves won 2–0 on aggregate and advanced to the second round.

Black Leopards won 6–4 on aggregate and advanced to the second round.

Royal Leopards won 3–2 on aggregate and advanced to the second round.

Club Africain won 3–1 on aggregate and advanced to the second round.

3–3 on aggregate. Simba won on the away goals rule and advanced to the second round.

Al-Ahly Shendi won 3–0 on aggregate and advanced to the second round.

Heartland won 2–1 on aggregate and advanced to the second round.

AC Léopards won 3–2 on aggregate and advanced to the second round.

ENPPI won 5–2 on aggregate and advanced to the second round.

Cercle Olympique won 5–4 on aggregate and advanced to the second round.

Wydad AC won 6–1 on aggregate and advanced to the second round.

AS Real Bamako won 3–2 on aggregate and advanced to the second round.

2–2 on aggregate. Interclube won the penalty shootout and advanced to the second round.

1–1 on aggregate. Alamal Atbara won on the away goals rule and advanced to the second round.

Second round
This was a knock-out stage of the 16 teams that advanced from the first round; winners advanced to the play-off round, where they were joined by the eight losers from the CAF Champions League second round.

First legs: 27–29 April; Second legs 11–13 May.

1–1 on aggregate. CODM Meknès won on the away goals rule and advanced to the play-off round.

3–3 on aggregate. Black Leopards won on the away goals rule and advanced to the play-off round.

Club Africain won 5–2 on aggregate and advanced to the play-off round.

3–3 on aggregate. Al-Ahly Shendi won the penalty shootout and advanced to the play-off round.

4–4 on aggregate. AC Léopards won on the away goals rule and advanced to the play-off round.

Cercle Olympique de Bamako won 4–3 on aggregate and advanced to the play-off round.

Wydad AC won 3–1 on aggregate and advanced to the play-off round.

Interclube won 6–1 on aggregate and advanced to the play-off round.

Play-off round
This was a knock-out stage of 16 teams: the eight teams that advanced from the second round, and the eight teams that were eliminated in the CAF Champions League second round. In each tie, a winner from the Confederation Cup second round played against a loser from the Champions League second round, with the Confederation Cup winner hosting the second leg at home. Winners advanced to the group stage.

The draw for the play-off round and group stage was held on 15 May 2012, 14:00 UTC+02:00, at the CAF Headquarters in Cairo. For the play-off round draw, two teams were seeded (using their individual 2007–2011 5-Year team Ranking).

Winners from Confederation Cup second round
 Wydad AC 20 pts
 Club Africain 17 pts
 Interclube 12 pts
 CODM Meknès 0 pts
 Black Leopards 0 pts
 Al-Ahly Shendi 0 pts
 AC Léopards 0 pts
 Cercle Olympique de Bamako 0 pts

Losers from Champions League second round
 Al-Hilal 37 pts (top seed)
 Maghreb de Fès 20 pts (top seed)
 Coton Sport 18 pts
 Stade Malien 12 pts
 Al-Merreikh 10 pts
 Dynamos 10 pts
 Djoliba 4 pts
 AFAD Djékanou 0 pts

First legs: 29 June–1 July; Second legs: 13–15 July.

AC Léopards won 2–1 on aggregate and advanced to the group stage.

Al-Hilal won 3–0 on aggregate and advanced to the group stage.

Wydad AC won 1–0 on aggregate and advanced to the group stage.

Al-Merreikh won 3–2 on aggregate and advanced to the group stage.

Note: First leg postponed due to heavy rains in Bamako.

2–2 on aggregate. Djoliba won the penalty shootout and advanced to the group stage.

Interclube won 1–0 on aggregate and advanced to the group stage.

Stade Malien won 4–1 on aggregate and advanced to the group stage.

Al-Ahly Shendi won 2–1 on aggregate and advanced to the group stage.

References

External links
CAF Confederation Cup

Qualifying rounds